The National Drama Festivals Association (NDFA) was formed in 1964 to encourage and support amateur theatre in all its forms and in particular through the organisation of drama festivals in the United Kingdom.

Since 1974 the NDFA has organised the British All Winners Drama Festival (BAWF) where the very best of British amateur theatre take part in a week-long celebration of theatre. The winners of all NDFA member festivals in the previous year, be they full-length or one-act member festivals, are eligible for invitation to take part.

The NDFA also sponsor a playwriting competition - the George Taylor Memorial Award. The objective of this competition is to promote new writing for the theatre. Adjudication is carried out by a panel of judges, and the winners receive a certificate and a cash prize.

Membership of the NDFA is open to all drama festival organisations and also to theatre groups and individuals who are interested in taking part and supporting drama festivals throughout the UK.

British All Winners Drama Festival

Awards
There are a number of awards presented at the British All Winners Drama Festival which include:
FULL LENGTH PLAYS
OVERALL WINNER - The Mary Blakeman Trophy
RUNNER UP - The Amateur Stage Trophy
ADJUDICATOR'S AWARD - The Felixstowe Festival Trophy
BACKSTAGE AWARD - The Sydney Fisher Trophy
ONE ACT PLAYS
OVERALL WINNER - The Irving Trophy
RUNNER UP - The NDFA Council Trophy
ADJUDICATOR'S AWARD - The Amateur Theatre Trophy
BACKSTAGE AWARD - The Sydney Fisher Trophy
AUDIENCE APPRECIATION - Halifax Evening Courier Award
YOUTH ENTRY
WINNER OF YOUTH SECTION - The NDFA Trophy
YOUTH PARTICIPATION AWARD - The Buxton Trophy
YOUTH AUDIENCE APPRECIATION - The GADOC Joyce Cook Memorial Trophy

Results

References

External links
 NATIONAL DRAMA FESTIVALS ASSOCIATION Official Website

Theatre festivals in the United Kingdom
Theatrical organisations in the United Kingdom
Arts organizations established in 1964
1964 establishments in the United Kingdom